Google Latitude was a location-aware feature of Google Maps, developed by Google as a successor to its earlier SMS-based service Dodgeball. Latitude allowed a mobile phone user to allow certain people to view their current location.  Via their own Google Account, the user's cell phone location was mapped on Google Maps.  The user could control the accuracy and details of what each of the other users can see — an exact location could be allowed, or it could be limited to identifying the city only. For privacy, it could also be turned off by the user, or a location could be manually entered. Users had to explicitly opt into Latitude, and were only able to see the location of those friends who had decided to share their location with them.

On July 10, 2013, Google announced plans to shut down Latitude, and it was discontinued on August 9, 2013. After the feature moved to Google+ in between, Google incorporated Latitude's location sharing feature into Google Maps in March 2017.

History

Dodgeball

Dodgeball was founded in 2000 by New York University students Dennis Crowley and Alex Rainert. The company was acquired by Google in 2005 and Crowley and Rainert hired, which led to the coinage of the term acquihire. In April 2007, Crowley and Rainert left Google, with Crowley describing their experience there as "incredibly frustrating". After leaving Google, Crowley created a similar service known as Foursquare with the help of Naveen Selvadurai.

Dodgeball offered a facility to users by way of SMS. Dodgeball was available for the cities of Seattle, Portland, San Francisco, Los Angeles, Las Vegas, San Diego, Phoenix, Dallas–Fort Worth, Austin, Houston, New Orleans, Miami, Atlanta, Washington, D.C., Philadelphia, New York City, Boston, Detroit, Chicago, Madison, Minneapolis–St. Paul and Denver.

In January 2009 Vic Gundotra, Vice President of Engineering at Google, announced that the company would "discontinue Dodgeball.com in the next couple of months, after which this service will no longer be available." Dodgeball was shut down and succeeded in February 2009 by Google Latitude.

Latitude
With Google Latitude, the service expanded to PC browsers (it used the Geolocation API as well as user-driven input) and automated location detection on mobile phones using cellular positioning, Wi-Fi positioning, and GPS.

In November 2009, Google announced a Latitude feature called "Location History" which stores and analyzes a user's location over time, for example attempting to identify a user's home and workplace.  Web-based Location History is now provided by Google Maps.

At the end of May 2010, Google announced an API which allows applications to make use of Latitude data, with the user's explicit consent.

In February 2012 a Leaderboard feature was added that provides point scoring and score comparison with friends.

Google Latitude was not available in Apple's Chinese App Store for download, but it might have been built into the Google Maps app.

Discontinuation

On July 10, 2013, Google announced plans to shut down Google Latitude on August 9, 2013. Google then offered location reporting on Google+, but this did not run on all the platforms that Google Maps does (BlackBerry, Windows Mobile, S60, etc.). Later it was fully migrated into Google Maps.

Compatibility
Google Latitude was compatible with most devices running iOS, Android, BlackBerry OS, Windows Mobile, and Symbian S60.
Initially Google stated on the Latitude page that it would be available for Java ME phones, but this claim was later removed from the site. On most platforms Latitude could continue to update the user's location in the background when the application was not in use, while on others it only updated the user's location when the application was in use.

The Sony Ericsson W995, C905, C903, C510, Elm and Satio mobile phones supported Google Latitude as part of their built-in Google Maps application. Although this was a Java ME application, it could not be downloaded for use with other mobile phones.

Privacy concerns
Amid concerns over locational privacy, Google announced that Latitude overwrites a user's previous location with the new location data and does not keep logs of locations provided to the service. It also reflected to whom the location was shared and can trace 24*7.

By early 2011, Google Latitude optionally recorded a history of places visited and counts time spent at each place. This information was then used to display statistics such as "Time At Work", "Time Spent At Home" and "Time Spent Out".

See also 
 Location-based service
 Find My Friends

References

External links 
Google Latitude

2009 software
Geosocial networking
Wireless locating
Latitude
Mobile social software
Satellite navigation software
Latitude
Latitude
Internet properties disestablished in 2013